The 2011 Indianapolis Grand Prix was the twelfth round of the 2011 Grand Prix motorcycle racing season. It took place on the weekend of August 26–28, 2011 at the Indianapolis Motor Speedway.

The event was held two weeks after the Indiana State Fair stage collapse, which led to the cancellation of the popular AMA Pro flat-track race at the Indiana State Fairgrounds which is held nearby during the Saturday night of the race meet.

MotoGP classification
The race took place in the afternoon from 14:00 local time, in dry and partly cloudy weather, with an ambient temperature of 26 °C (80 °F).

Moto2 classification

125 cc classification

Championship standings after the race (MotoGP)
Below are the standings for the top five riders and constructors after round twelve has concluded.

Riders' Championship standings

Constructors' Championship standings

 Note: Only the top five positions are included for both sets of standings.

References

Indianapolis motorcycle Grand Prix
Indianapolis
Indianapolis motorcycle Grand Prix
Indianapolis motorcycle Grand Prix
Indianapolis motorcycle Grand Prix